Tesarius caelatus is a species of aphodiine dung beetle in the family Scarabaeidae. It is found in Australia, Europe and Northern Asia (excluding China), North America, and South America.

References

Further reading

External links

 

Scarabaeidae
Articles created by Qbugbot
Beetles described in 1857